Cero or CERO may refer to:

 Cero (fish), a large food and game fish of the scombroid family, found chiefly in the West Indies
 Computer Entertainment Rating Organization, the organization that rates video games and computer software in Japan
 , more than one United States Navy ship
 Cero (TV channel) or #0, Spanish TV channel

See also
Cerro (disambiguation)
Serro, a municipality in Minas Gerais, Brazil